Kalvan (also Romanized as Kalvān; also known as Khālwān) is a village in Esfandan Rural District, in the Central District of Komijan County, Markazi Province, Iran. At the 2006 census, its population was 847, in 193 families.

References 

Populated places in Komijan County